The Loggia del Pesce is a historical building in Florence, Italy. It is formed by nine wide arcades, supported by piers or columns. On each side are eight medallions depicting  fishing activities and the sea. At the corners are four coats of arms.

It was commissioned by Duke Cosimo I de' Medici to Giorgio Vasari, to house the fish market which had been previously held near the Ponte Vecchio. Their place there was taken by the Vasari Corridor.

During the urban renovation of Florence following the unification of Italy (1885–1895), the loggia was dismantled and most of its decoration went to the museum of San Marco. It was rebuilt in the Piazza Ciompi only in 1956, re-using most of the original materials.

Sources

Loggias in Florence
Buildings and structures completed in 1567
Renaissance architecture in Florence